{{Infobox album
| name       = Corazón Latino
| type       = Studio album
| artist     = David Bisbal
| cover      = Corazoncover.jpg
| alt        =
| released   = 
| recorded   = March - April 2002
| venue      =
| studio     =
 Estudio G
 Estudios Aurha (Barcelona, Spain)
 JMV Studios
 South Beach Audio
 MT Studio (New York, New York)
 Critiera Moon Studios
 One-Take Studios
 The Hit Factory
 The Gallery Recording Studios
 Santander Studios (Miami, Florida)
| genre      = Latin pop • Latin ballad
| length     = 42:15
| label      = Vale Music · Universal Music Spain · Universal Music Latino
| producer   = 
 José Gaviria
 Bernardo Ossa
 Kike Santander
 José Miguel Velásquez
 Fernando Tobón
 Daniel Betancourt
 Andrés Múnera
| prev_title =
| prev_year  =
| next_title = Bulería
| next_year  = 2004
| misc       = 
}}
Corazón Latino, is the debut studio album recorded by Spanish singer David Bisbal. It was released by Vale Music, Universal Music Spain and Universal Music Latino on October 15, 2002 (see 2002 in music). The album received international attention and sold 1.3 million copies in Spain. The second track, "Digale", is featured on Televisa's hit soap-opera Cuidado con el ángel (2008-2009).

Track listing

Charts and certifications

Charts

Certifications

See also
List of best-selling albums in Spain
 List of best-selling Latin albums

References

External links
 David Bisbal's official website

2002 debut albums
David Bisbal albums
Universal Music Spain albums
Universal Music Latino albums
Spanish-language albums
Albums produced by Kike Santander